Reiner Thoni (born August 22, 1984) is a Canadian ski mountaineer and member of the national selection.

Thoni is born in Jasper, Alberta. He lives in Valemount, British Columbia, Canada.

Selected results 
 2012:
 1st (and 2nd in the World ranking), North American Championship, sprint
 1st (and 3rd in the World ranking), North American Championship, individual
 1st (and 3rd in the World ranking), North American Championship, total ranking

References

External links 
 Thoni's blog

1984 births
Living people
Canadian male ski mountaineers
People from Jasper, Alberta